The Western Pomerania Lagoon Area National Park (Nationalpark Vorpommersche Boddenlandschaft) is Mecklenburg-Vorpommern's largest national park, situated at the coast of the Baltic Sea. It consists of several peninsulas, islands and lagoon shore areas in the Baltic Sea, belonging to the district of Vorpommern-Rügen.

The national park includes:

 the Darß peninsula
 the western coast of the island of Rügen
 the island of Hiddensee
 the island of Ummanz
 several tiny islets between the above places
 the multiple lagoons in between the land masses

The national park is characterised by very shallow water housing a unique coastal fauna. All portions of the national park are famous for being a resting place for tens of thousands of cranes and geese.

Its area is 805 km2.

Composition 
Approximately half the area of the park is open Baltic Sea; more than another quarter covers parts of the lagoons in the Darss-Zingst Bodden Chain including the West Rügen Bodden. Thus it protects these shallow water areas (in the Baltic Sea, the National Park boundary is based on the ten-metre depth contour) with their rich flora and fauna. The differing salt content of the brackish water habitats of the Baltic and the bodden (shallow lagoons) contribute significantly to the local diversity of nature. For example, the Baltic Herring visits the shallow bays regularly to spawn here.

The territory of the national park includes parts of the Darß and the peninsula of Zingst as well as most of the island of Hiddensee. In addition, a narrow strip of land on the island of Rügen, next to the bodden lies within the national park. Pine and beech woods, such as the Darß Forest, cover much of the land. In treeless areas there are bogs, resulting from coastal flooding.

References

Sources 
 
 
 Frank Gnoth-Austen, Rudolf Specht: Jasmund, Vorpommersche Boddenlandschaft. Vehling, Werl 1995,  (Deutsche Nationalparke, Vol. 2).
 Norbert Rosing, Sarah Fuchs, Klaus Nigge: Deutsche Nationalparks. Tecklenborg, Steinfurt 1997, .

External links

Official website of the Western Pomerania Lagoon Area National Park 
 
 

National parks of Germany
Protected areas of Mecklenburg-Western Pomerania
Protected areas established in 1990
Fischland-Darß-Zingst
Lagoons of Mecklenburg-Western Pomerania
1990 establishments in East Germany
Tourist attractions in Mecklenburg-Western Pomerania